European route E 402 is a European B class road in France, connecting the cities Calais, Rouen and Le Mans.

Route 
 
 E15, E40 Calais
 E46 Rouen
 E50, E501, E502 Le Mans

External links 
 UN Economic Commission for Europe: Overall Map of E-road Network (2007)
 International E-road network

402
E402